A parliamentary train was a passenger service operated in the United Kingdom to comply with the Railway Regulation Act 1844 that required train companies to provide inexpensive and basic rail transport for less affluent passengers. The act required that at least one such service per day be run on every railway route in the UK.

Now no longer a legal requirement (although most franchise agreements require such trains), the term now describes train services that continue to be run to avoid the cost of formal closure of a route or station but with reduced services often to just one train per week and without specially low prices. Such services are often called "ghost trains".

Nineteenth-century usage

In the earliest days of passenger railways in the United Kingdom the poor were encouraged to travel in order to find employment in the growing industrial centres, but trains were generally unaffordable to them except in the most basic of open wagons, in many cases attached to goods trains. Political pressure caused the Board of Trade to investigate, and Sir Robert Peel's Conservative government enacted the Railway Regulation Act 1844, which took effect on 1 November 1844. It compelled "the provision of at least one train a day each way at a speed of not less than 12 miles an hour including stops, which were to be made at all stations, and of carriages protected from the weather and provided with seats; for all which luxuries not more than a penny a mile might be charged".

Railway companies reluctantly complied with the law. They scheduled parliamentary trains at inconvenient times and used uncomfortable carriages. One account stated that when passengers complained about a delay, they were told "ye are only the nigger train". James Allport of Midland Railway was proud of providing comfortable third-class service passenger service, but stated that his company needed 25 years to do so.

In popular culture

The basic comfort and slow progress of Victorian parliamentary trains led to a humorous reference in Gilbert and Sullivan's comic opera The Mikado. The Mikado is explaining how he will match punishments to the crimes committed:
The idiot who, in railway carriages,
Scribbles on window-panes
Will only suffer
To ride on a buffer
In Parliamentary trains.

Legacy of the Beeching cuts

In 1963 under its chairman Richard Beeching, British Railways produced The Reshaping of British Railways report, designed to stem the huge losses being incurred as patronage declined. It proposed very substantial cuts to the network and to train services, with many lines closed under a programme that came to be known as the Beeching cuts. The Transport Act 1962 included a formal closure process allowing for objections to closures on the basis of hardship to passengers if their service was closed. As the objections gained momentum, this process became increasingly difficult to implement, and from about 1970 closures slowed to a trickle.

In certain cases, where there was exceptionally low usage, the train service was reduced to a bare minimum but the service was not formally closed, avoiding the costs associated with closure. In some cases, the service was reduced to one train a week and in one direction only.

These minimal services had resonances of the 19th-century parliamentary services and, among rail enthusiasts, they came to be referred to as "parliamentary trains", "ghost trains", or, more colloquially, "parly" trains (following the abbreviation used in Victorian timetables). However, this terminology has no official standing. So-called parliamentary services are also typically run at inconvenient times, often very early in the morning, very late at night or in the middle of the day at the weekend. In extreme instances, rail services have actually been "temporarily" withdrawn and replaced by substitute bus services, to maintain the pretence that the service has not been withdrawn.

Speller Act
When the closures brought about by the Beeching Report had reached equilibrium, it was recognised that some incremental services or station reopenings were desirable. However, if a service was started and proved unsuccessful, it could not be closed again without going through the formal process, with the possibility that it might not be terminated. It was recognised that this discouraged possible desirable developments and the Transport Act 1962 (Amendment) Act 1981 permitted the immediate closure of such experimental reopenings. The bill that led to the Act of 1981 was sponsored by a pro-railways Member of Parliament, Tony Speller, and it is usually referred to as the Speller Act. The process is still in effect, although the legislation has been subsumed into other enactments.

Services

Current
Examples of lines in the December 2022 timetable served only by a parliamentary train are:

Former
Examples of lines formerly served only by a Parliamentary train are:

Stations with minimal services

A station may have a parliamentary service because the operating company wishes it closed, but the line is in regular use (most trains pass straight through). Examples include:

 Barlaston and Wedgwood, which are currently only served by replacement buses.
, which serves Teesside International Airport, lost most of its services due to its relatively long distance to the terminal as well as competition from buses which offered more reliable services (which in turn were withdrawn due to the airport's sharp decrease in air passengers). The current service is operated only on Sundays and comprises the 14:56 to Darlington from Hartlepool. Operated by Northern Trains. Service has been suspended since May 2022.
, near Bristol – only two trains per week, both from Cardiff Central on Saturdays only at 08:33 (to Penzance) and 14:33 (to Taunton). Formerly one train each way per week, but the bridge to the down platform was removed in November 2016. Operated by Great Western Railway.
From 19 May 2019, these stations are only served Monday-Saturday by the southbound 06:06 Arbroath to Dundee and 07:44 Arbroath to Edinburgh Waverley; northbound services are the 16:09 Glasgow Queen Street to Arbroath service (16:10 Saturday) and the 17:02 Edinburgh Waverley to Arbroath service (17:01 Saturday). Operated by ScotRail.
Shippea Hill is served at 07:26 Mondays–Fridays (07:47 Saturday) eastbound (to Norwich) and 16:13 Saturdays only westbound (to Stansted Airport). Lakenheath, however, is served by seven trains on a Sunday (4 eastbound, 3 westbound). There are no services Monday–Friday and just a single journey in each direction on Saturdays (11:13 westbound, 15:49 eastbound). Both operated by Abellio Greater Anglia.
  has one train per day Mondays–Saturdays, northbound only at 06:50. After major works on the West Coast Main Line, contractors neglected to replace the footbridge which they had removed, leaving passengers unable to access southbound trains. Operated by West Midlands Trains.
, in Cornwall has been served by one train in each direction daily since the Park & Ride facility at the station moved to nearby St Erth. Operated by Great Western Railway.
Operated by Northern Trains.
 in Nottinghamshire is served by a single train in each direction Monday to Saturday and no Sunday service. Operated by East Midlands Railway.

 is served by a single train on Saturdays only, however the station remains open for use when Birmingham City Football Club are playing at home when additional services call there. Operated by West Midlands Trains.

In the mid-1990s British Rail was forced to serve  in the West Midlands for an extra 12 months after a legal blunder meant that the station had not been closed properly. One train per week each way still called at Smethwick West, even though it was only a few hundred yards from the replacement .

Many least used stations are also served infrequently or irregularly.

Bustitution

A variant of the parliamentary train service was the temporary replacement bus service, as employed between Watford and Croxley Green in Hertfordshire. The railway line was closed to trains in 1996, but to avoid the legal complications and costs of actual closure train services were replaced by buses, thus maintaining the legal fiction of an open railway. The branch was officially closed in 2003. Work in track clearance commenced, beginning the work to absorb most of the route into a diversion of the Watford branch of the Metropolitan line into Watford Junction, but work was stopped in 2016 after a reassessment of likely costs and lack of agreement on funding.

The temporary replacement bus tactic was used from December 2008 between Ealing Broadway and Wandsworth Road when Arriva CrossCountry withdrew its services from Brighton to Manchester, which was the only passenger service between Factory Junction, north of Wandsworth Road, and Latchmere Junction, on the West London Line. This service was later replaced by a single daily return train between Kensington Olympia and Wandsworth Road (as above) operated by Southern until formal consultation commenced and closure was completed in 2013.

The replacement bus tactic was used to service Norton Bridge, Barlaston and Wedgwood stations on the Stafford–Manchester line, which had its passenger services withdrawn in 2004 to allow more Virgin CrossCountry and Virgin Trains West Coast services to be operated. Norton Bridge station was closed in December 2017 coinciding with the transfer of the West Midlands franchise from London Midland to West Midlands Trains, with funding for the bus service to Norton Bridge continuing until March 2019.

See also
Closure by stealth
List of least used railway stations of Great Britain
Rail replacement bus service
Stations still open but with no services

Notes

References

Bibliography
 Billson, P. (1996). Derby and the Midland Railway. Derby: Breedon Books.
 Jordana, Jacint; Levi-Faur, David (2004). The politics of regulation: institutions and regulatory reforms for the age of governance. Edward Elgar Publishing. .
 Ransom, P. J. G. (1990). The Victorian Railway and How It Evolved. London: Heinemann.

External links
Railways Archive: An Act to attach certain Conditions to the Construction of future Railways 1844
 Passenger Train Services Over Unusual Lines
 Unusual Routes in Timetable, gensheet.co.uk
 London Underground Obscure Workings
 On board a real life ghost train

Passenger rail transport in the United Kingdom